Border: Day One (stylized in all caps) is the debut extended play (EP) by South Korean boy band Enhypen.  It was released through Belift Lab, Genie Music and Stone Music Entertainment on November 30, 2020. The album consists of six tracks, including the lead single "Given-Taken".

Background and release
Enhypen was formed through the 2020 survival competition series I-Land and is the first group ever to be produced by Belift Lab, a joint venture between the South Korean entertainment agencies CJ ENM and Big Hit Entertainment. After the debut line-up was revealed through the show's live finale on September 18, 2020, Belift Lab launched the group's official website and social media platforms. A pre-debut promotion schedule was released on September 30. On October 22, 2020, a debut trailer titled "Choose-Chosen" was posted to Enhypen's YouTube channel, announcing their debut in November 2020. The video portrayed the seven band members in a dark forest with words of opposite meanings such as "Failure-Success," "Given-Taken," "Blood-Light," "Us-the Others," and "Mortal-Immortal," on the screen. A second trailer titled "Dusk-Dawn" was released on October 25, followed by a pair of concept mood boards released on October 27. On October 28, Belift Lab announced through the global fan community platform Weverse that Enhypen will release their first extended play, Border: Day One on November 30. Pre-orders began the same day and the album was made available in two versions: Dusk and Dawn. Solo concept photos for the "Dusk" version were revealed on October 31. A group concept photo was teased the next day. Solo and group concept photos for the "Dawn" version were posted on November 9 and 10, respectively. Moving portraits of the seven members were revealed sequentially from the afternoon of November 12 till November 13. The band shared a lyric video of the intro titled "Intro: Walk the Line" from the album, three days later. The album's track list was posted on November 20. A preview of the tracks featured on the album was released on November 23. Two music video teasers for the lead single "Given-Taken" were uploaded to YouTube on November 25 and 27, respectively. The album was released on November 30, 2020, in CD and digital formats. The music video for the lead single "Given-Taken", directed by Yong Seok Choi of Lumpens, was released to Big Hit's YouTube channel in conjunction with the release of the album.

Promotion
A few hours prior to the album release, Enhypen held their first-ever media showcase in Seoul, which was broadcast online through YouTube. The band performed the songs "Given-Taken" and "Let Me In (20 CUBE)" for the first time at the showcase. Hours after the album release, a debut show titled "Enhypen Debut Show: Day One" hosted by Mnet, was premiered worldwide, where Enhypen performed "Flicker", "Let Me In (20 CUBE)", "10 Months" and "Given-Taken". The band performed "Given-Taken" again on the 2020 FNS Music Festival on December 2. Enhypen began promoting the album with televised live performances on several South Korean weekly music programs, starting with KBS' Music Bank on December 4, where they performed "Given-Taken". The band also appeared on SBS' Inkigayo and SBS MTV's The Show, to perform the song. Enhypen also performed the song at the 2020 Mnet Asian Music Awards on December 6 and the 2020 The Fact Music Awards on December 12. On December 18, they performed the song at the 2020 KBS Song Festival and MTV Fresh Live Out. Enhypen performed the song at the SBS Gayo Daejeon on December 25.

Commercial performance
On November 4, it was announced that album pre-orders had surpassed 150,000 copies in just two days. By November 21, pre-orders had surpassed 300,000 copies.

Border: Day One debuted at number one on the Gaon Album Chart on the chart issue dated December 5, 2020. On the Hanteo Chart, the album sold 280,873 copies during its first week of release, breaking the record for the highest-sales among the K-pop groups that debuted in 2020. Border: Day One was the second best-selling album of November 2020 in South Korea, selling 318,528  physical copies. Border: Day One debuted at number one on the Japanese Oricon Daily Album Chart on issue date of December 4, 2020. The album entered the Oricon Weekly Albums Chart at number two, selling 71,404 copies in its first week. The EP opened at number two on Billboard Japan's Hot Albums chart on the chart issue dated December 14, 2020, while "Given-Taken" arrived at number 45 on the Japan Hot 100.

Track listing
Credits adapted from Spotify and physical album credits.

Credits and personnel
Credits adapted from KuWo and QQ Music.

 Enhypenvocals 
 Heeseungbackground vocals 
 Jakebackground vocals 
 CA$HCOWbackground vocals , vocal arrangement , synthesizer , digital editing , choir arrangement 
 Melanie Joy Fontanabackground vocals 
 Kyler Nikobackground vocals , recording engineer 
 Sunshine (Cazzi Opeia & Ellen Berg)background vocals , recording engineer 
 Vendors (Kevin Leinster Jr.)background vocals 
 JUNEbackground vocals 
 Ryan Lawriebackground vocals 
 Wonderkidkeyboard , vocal arrangement , digital editing , synthesizer 
 YOUNGguitar 
 Yung Stringstring 
 "Hitman" Bang synthesizer 
 FRANTSkeyboard , bass 
 Lostboykeyboard , drum programming 
 Max Grahamsynthesizer , guitar , background vocals , programming 
 Matt Thomsonsynthesizer , guitar , background vocals , programming 
 Yeon Eum Children's Choir choir 
 Shin Kungstring arrangement , vocal arrangement , digital editing , keyboard , choir arrangement 
 Kim Jiyeonrecording engineer 
 Kim Chorongrecording engineer 
 Oh Seong-geunrecording engineer 
 Son Yu-jeongrecording engineer 
 Michel "Lindgren" Schulzrecording engineer 
 Woo Min-jeongdigital editing 
 Yang Gamix engineer 
 Manny Marrouinmix engineer 
 Jeremie Inhabermix engineer 
 Phil Tanmix engineer 
 Erik Madridmix engineer 
 Park Jinsemix engineer 
 Jeong Woo-yeongmix engineer 
 Bill Zimmermanadditional engineering 
 Chris Gallandassistant mixer 
 Zach Pereyraassistant mixer 
 Aaron Bermanassistant mixer 
 Augustine Limassistant mixer

Accolades

Charts

Weekly charts

Monthly chart

Year-end charts

Certifications and sales

Release history

References

2020 debut EPs
Enhypen EPs
Genie Music EPs
Korean-language EPs
Hybe Corporation EPs